Marina Veilleux is a marina and unincorporated locality in geographic Hanlan Township, Cochrane District in Northeastern Ontario, Canada. It serves as a jumping off point for travel on the lake.

References

Other map sources:

Communities in Cochrane District